Zavozin, Zavozina is a surname. Notable people with the surname include:

Igor Zavozin (1955–2019), Soviet ice dancer
Maxim Zavozin (born 1985), Russian ice dancer, son of Igor

Russian-language surnames